Solomon II (1772 – February 7, 1815), of the Bagrationi Dynasty, was the last King of Imereti (western Georgia) from 1789 to 1790 and from 1792 until his deposition by the Imperial Russian government in 1810.

He was born as David to Prince Archil of Imereti, brother of King Solomon I of Imereti, by his wife Helene, daughter of King Heraclius II of Georgia. Solomon I, who died in 1784 without a male heir, named his nephew David as his successor. However, Solomon's cousin David II prevented him, and another rival prince, from being crowned as king and occupied the throne, leading to a civil war. Heraclius II interfered on behalf of his grandson and sent in an army, defeating David II at the Battle of Matkhoji on June 11, 1789. David, son of Archil, was crowned as King of Imereti under the name of Solomon II, but David II continued his efforts to resume the throne until his final defeat in 1792. He ruled under the protection of his maternal grandfather, Heraclius II, and continued Solomon I's policy of restricting the powers of feudal aristocracy. In 1795, he and Heraclius fought with a small Imeretian force at the Battle of Krtsanisi against the Persians, only to be completely defeated by the latter.

After Heraclius' death in 1798, and the annexation of the eastern Georgian kingdom of Kartli-Kakheti (east of Imereti) by Russia in 1800, the situation in Imereti became precarious. His refractory vassals, princes of Mingrelia and Guria (west of Imereti), assumed the Russian protection and put forward territorial claims to the royal domains. Solomon attempted to enlist Ottoman and Persian support against the anticipated Russian encroachment. However, the Russian commander in Georgia, Prince Pavel Tsitsianov, moved his army into Imereti and forced Solomon to succumb to Russian vassalage in the convention of Elaznauri of April 25, 1804. Yet, Solomon's relations with Russia continued to be strained. On February 20, 1810, the Russian administration removed Solomon from the throne and sent in troops to take control of the kingdom. Solomon retaliated by rallying people against Russia and tried to enlist Turkey, Persia and Napoleonic France in his cause. Outnumbered and defeated, Solomon fled to the Ottoman possessions in Trebizond where he died in 1815 and was buried at the Saint Gregory of Nyssa Church. The body of Solomon II, the last reigning Georgian king, was moved from Trebizond to Gelati Monastery, Georgia, in 1990.

Solomon was married to Mariam (1783–1841), daughter of Katsia Dadiani, Prince of Mingrelia, with no children.

References

Kings of Imereti
Bagrationi dynasty of the Kingdom of Imereti
Battle of Krtsanisi
1772 births
1815 deaths
18th-century people from Georgia (country)
19th-century people from Georgia (country)
Eastern Orthodox monarchs
Georgian emigrants to the Ottoman Empire